Francisco de Bricio (15 August 1890 – 5 February 1978) was a Brazilian rower. He competed in the men's coxed pair event at the 1932 Summer Olympics.

References

External links
 

1890 births
1978 deaths
Brazilian male rowers
Olympic rowers of Brazil
Rowers at the 1932 Summer Olympics
People from Juiz de Fora
Sportspeople from Minas Gerais